Central Indiana Conference is an eight-member IHSAA Conference spanning Blackford, Grant, and Madison Counties.

Membership

 Madison-Grant's school district also covers part of Madison County. Oak Hill's district likewise covers part of Miami County. The town of Converse is actually in Miami County, though the physical school building is in Grant County but is addressed to Converse.

Former Members

 Huntington North was known as Huntington before 1966.
 Played concurrently in BCC and CIAC 1945-53.
 Played concurrently in the CIAC and FWCS 1945-47.

Sponsored Sports

Conference Championships

Football

Boys Basketball 

 Championships before 1993-94 season unverified.

Girls Basketball

2012 Football Coaches
Alexandra- Pete Gast 
Blackford- Steve Rinker
Eastbrook- Jeff Adamson 
Elwood- Marty Wells
Frankton- Randy England
Madison-Grant - Beau Engle
Mississinewa- Curt Funk
Oak Hill - Bud Ozmun

State Champions and Finalists

Alexandria Monroe Tigers
1998 Boys 2A State Basketball Champions 
1998 Boys 2A State Baseball Champions

Blackford Bruins

1974 IHSAA Class 2A Football State Champions
1979 IHSAA Class 2A Football State Champions
1977 IHSAA State Baseball Runner-Up
1978 IHSAA State Baseball Mental Attitude Award: Brian Lanham 
1978 IHSAA State Baseball Runner-Up
1987 IHSAA State Boys Cross Country 5th
1990 IHSAA State Girls Golf Individual: Erika Wicoff Runner-Up
1991 IHSAA State Girls Golf Individual: Erika Wicoff Runner-Up
1991 IHSAA State Girls Golf Mental Attitude Award: Erika Wicoff
1991 IHSAA State Girls Golf Team Runner-Up
1992 IHSAA State Girls Golf Team Runner-Up

Eastbrook Panthers
2004 Football State Runners-up
2016 Football State Runners-up
2018 Football State Runners-up
2019 Football State Runners-up

Elwood Community Panthers
1987 Class 3A state runner up football
1999 State Wrestling Finalists
2008 class 2A state runner up baseball
2017 Class 2A State Runner up softball

Frankton Eagles
2000 Class 2A State Softball Champions
2003 Class 2A State Baseball Runner-Up
2005 Class 2A State Softball Runner-Up
2006 Class 2A State Softball Runner-Up
2015 Class 2A State Boys Basketball Runner-Up
2017 Class 2A State Boys Basketball Champions

Madison-Grant Argylls
2009 Class 2A Softball Champions

Mississinewa Indians

Oak Hill Golden Eagles
1982 IHSAA Class A Football State Champs
2008 IHSAA Class 2A Girls Basketball State Runner-Up
2009 IHSAA Class 2A Girls Basketball State Runner-Up
2017 IHSAA Class 2A Girls Basketball State Runner-Up
2018 IHSAA Class 2A Boys Basketball State Champs
2019 IHSSA Class 2A Girls Basketball State Champs

Resources 
 IHSAA Conferences
 IHSAA Directory
 CIC History
 Nicknames and Colors

References

Indiana high school athletic conferences
High school sports conferences and leagues in the United States